Charles Edward Fuller may refer to:

Charles E. Fuller (Baptist minister) (1887–1968), American Christian clergyman and radio evangelist
Charles E. Fuller (New York politician) (1847–1925), New York farmer and politician

See also
Charles Fuller (disambiguation)